Bubastis (Bohairic Coptic:  Poubasti; Greek:  Boubastis or  Boubastos), also known in Arabic as Tell-Basta or in Egyptian as Per-Bast, was an ancient Egyptian city. Bubastis is often identified with the biblical Pi-Beseth ( py-bst, Ezekiel 30:17). It was the capital of its own nome, located along the River Nile in the Delta region of Lower Egypt, and notable as a center of worship for the feline goddess Bastet, and therefore the principal depository in Egypt of mummies of cats. 

Its ruins are located in the suburbs of the modern city of Zagazig.

Etymology
The name of Bubastis in Egyptian is Pr-Bȝst.t, conventionally pronounced Per-Bast but its Earlier Egyptian pronunciation can be reconstructed as /ˈpaɾu-buˈʀistit/. It is a compound of Egyptian  “house" and the name of the goddess Bastet; thus the phrase means "House of Bast". In later forms of Egyptian, sound shifts had altered the pronunciation.

History

Bubastis served as the capital of the nome of Am-Khent, the 18th nome of Lower Egypt. Bubastis was situated southwest of Tanis, upon the eastern side of the Pelusiac branch of the Nile. The nome and city of Bubastis were allotted to the Calasirian division of the Egyptian war-caste.

Twelfth Dynasty
In the Middle Kingdom, Tell Basta was the site of a large mudbrick palace (16,000 sqm) dated to the Twelft Dynasty. It has been thought to be a residence of Amenemhat III. A limestone lintel shows the king during his Heb Sed Festival.

Second Intermediate Period
Following the Twelfth Dynasty, the Middle Kingdom faded out. At Bubastis, a red granite architrave belonged to Sekhemre Khutawy Khabaw. In another monument found at Tanis, he is mentioned along with Hor.

Twenty-Second Dynasty
It became a royal residence after Shoshenq I, the first ruler and founder of the 22nd Dynasty, became pharaoh in 943 BC. Bubastis was its height during this dynasty and the 23rd. It declined after the conquest by Cambyses II in 525 BC, which heralded the end of the Saite 26th Dynasty and the start of the Achaemenid Empire.

The Twenty Second Dynasty of Egyptian monarchs consisted of nine, or, according to Eusebius of three Bubastite kings, and during their reigns the city was one of the most considerable places in the Delta. Immediately to the south of Bubastis were the allotments of land with which Psamtik I rewarded the services of his Ionian and Carian mercenaries; and on the northern side of the city commenced the Canal of the Pharaohs, which Pharaoh Necho II began (but never finished) to go between the Nile and the Red Sea.

Persian rule and decline 

After Bubastis was taken by the Persians, its walls were dismantled. From this period it gradually declined, although it appears in ecclesiastical annals among the episcopal sees of the province Augustamnica Secunda. Bubastite coins of the age of Hadrian exist.
The following is the description which Herodotus gives of Bubastis, as it appeared shortly after the period of the Persian invasion, 525 BC, and Hamilton remarks that the plan of the ruins remarkably warrants the accuracy of this historical eye-witness:

Religion

Bubastis was a center of worship for the feline goddess Bastet, sometimes called Bubastis after the city, who the Greeks identified with Artemis. The cat was the sacred and peculiar animal of Bast, who is represented with the head of a cat or a lioness and frequently accompanies the deity Ptah in monumental inscriptions. The tombs at Bubastis were accordingly the principal depository in Egypt of the mummies of the cat.

The most distinguished features of the city and nome of Bubastis were its oracle of Bast, the splendid temple of that goddess and the annual procession in honor of her. The oracle gained in popularity and importance after the influx of Greek settlers into the Delta, since the identification of Bast with Artemis attracted to her shrine both native Egyptians and foreigners.

The festival of Bubastis was considered the most joyous and gorgeous of all in the Egyptian calendar as described by Herodotus:

Christian bishopric
Extant documents mention the names of three Christian bishops of Bubastis of the 4th and 5th centuries:
 Harpocration, one of the bishops ordained by Melitius of Lycopolis listed in 325
 Hermon, a contemporary of Athanasius of Alexandria, in about 362
 Iulianus at the Second Council of Ephesus in 449

Excavations
The tomb of the late New Kingdom vizier Iuty was discovered in December 1964 in the "Cemetery of the Nobles" of Bubastis by the Egyptian archaeologist Shafik Farid.

Since 2008, the German-Egyptian "Tell Basta Project" has been conducting excavations at Bubastis. Previously, in March 2004, a well preserved copy of the Decree of Canopus was discovered in the city.

See also
 List of ancient Egyptian towns and cities

References

External links

Tell Basta Project (EES/ University of Göttingen/ SCA) Egypt Exploration Society
Preliminary German website of Tell Basta Project
Finds from Bubastis on the website of MUSEUMS IN THE NILE DELTA (project M.i.N.)

Populated places established in the 10th century BC
Populated places disestablished in the 1st millennium
Archaeological sites in Egypt
Hebrew Bible cities
Roman sites in Egypt
Former populated places in Egypt
Nile Delta
Tells (archaeology)
Former capitals of Egypt
Bastet